Martin Collegiate, also known as Martin Collegiate Institute or MCI, is a high school located in the Rosemont/Mount Royal neighbourhood in the north end of Regina, Saskatchewan, Canada. A part of Regina Public Schools, it is a designated community school, and currently has a student body population of approximately 750.

Martin's current feeder elementary schools are McLurg School, Rosemont Community School, Ruth M. Buck School, and Walker School.

Namesake
Martin Collegiate is named for William Melville Martin, a lawyer and politician who served from 1916 until 1922 as Saskatchewan's second premier. He also served as Member of Parliament for Regina.  William Martin was also a judge of the Saskatchewan Court of Appeal for thirty-nine years (1922-1961), including twenty years as Chief Justice of Saskatchewan (1941-1961).

Affiliated communities
Dieppe (pop. 1815)
McNab (pop. 1505)
Normanview (pop. 4280)
Normanview West (pop. 3240)
North Central (pop. 10,350)
Prairie View (pop. 6325)
Regent Park (pop. 2755)
Rosemont/Mount Royal (pop. 8485)

References

External links
Martin Collegiate website

High schools in Regina, Saskatchewan
Educational institutions established in 1959
1959 establishments in Saskatchewan